Johnny Bolang (born 8 August 1941) is an Indonesian boxer. He competed in the men's lightweight event at the 1960 Summer Olympics.

References

1941 births
Living people
Indonesian male boxers
Olympic boxers of Indonesia
Boxers at the 1960 Summer Olympics
Sportspeople from Surabaya
Asian Games medalists in boxing
Boxers at the 1962 Asian Games
Asian Games bronze medalists for Indonesia
Medalists at the 1962 Asian Games
Lightweight boxers
20th-century Indonesian people
21st-century Indonesian people